Colin McGinn (born 10 March 1950) is a British philosopher. He has held teaching posts and professorships at University College London, the University of Oxford, Rutgers University, and the University of Miami.

McGinn is best known for his work in the philosophy of mind, and in particular for what is known as new mysterianism, the idea that the human mind is not equipped to solve the problem of consciousness. He is the author of over 20 books on this and other areas of philosophy, including The Character of Mind (1982), The Problem of Consciousness (1991), Consciousness and Its Objects (2004), and The Meaning of Disgust (2011).

In 2013, McGinn resigned from his tenured position at the University of Miami after being accused of sexual harassment by a female graduate student. The resignation touched off a debate about the prevalence of sexism and sexual harassment within academic philosophy.

Early life and education
McGinn was born in West Hartlepool, a town in County Durham, England. Several of his relatives, including both grandfathers, were miners. His father, Joseph, left school to become a miner but put himself through night school and became a building manager instead. McGinn was the eldest of three children, all sons. When he was three, the family moved to Gillingham, Kent, and eight years later to Blackpool, Lancashire. Having failed his 11-plus, he attended a technical school in Kent, then a secondary modern in Blackpool, but did well enough in his O-levels to be transferred to the local grammar school for his A-levels.

In 1968, he began a degree in psychology at the University of Manchester, obtaining a first-class honours degree in 1971 and an MA in 1972, also in psychology. He was admitted in 1972 to Jesus College, Oxford, at first to study for a Bachelor of Letters postgraduate degree, but switched to the Bachelor of Philosophy (BPhil) postgraduate programme on the recommendation of his advisor, Michael R. Ayers. In 1973, he was awarded the university's prestigious John Locke Prize in Mental Philosophy; one of the examiners was A.J. Ayer. He received his BPhil in 1974, writing a thesis under the supervision of Michael R. Ayers and P. F. Strawson on the semantics of Donald Davidson.

Teaching career

Posts
McGinn taught at University College London for 11 years, first as a lecturer in philosophy (1974–1984), then as reader (1984–1985). In 1985, he succeeded Gareth Evans as Wilde Reader in Mental Philosophy at the University of Oxford, a position he held until 1990. He held visiting professorships at the University of California, Los Angeles (1979), University of Bielefeld (1982), University of Southern California (1983), Rutgers University (1984), University of Helsinki (1986), City University of New York (1988) and Princeton University (1992). In 1990, he joined the philosophy department at Rutgers as a full professor, working alongside Jerry Fodor. 

In 2006, he joined the University of Miami as Professor of Philosophy and Cooper Fellow.

Sexual harassment complaint
McGinn resigned his position at the University of Miami in January 2013, effective at the end of the calendar year, after a female graduate student complained that he had been sexually harassing her, including by text and email. These documents have since been released and include explicit references to McGinn's desire to have sex with the student. He denied any wrongdoing.

Represented by Ann Olivarius, the student complained in April 2014 to the Equal Employment Opportunity Commission that the university had mishandled the case. She filed a lawsuit in October 2015 against the university, McGinn, and Edward Erwin, another philosophy professor at the University of Miami. The complaint accused McGinn of sexual harassment, civil assault and defamation, and Erwin of defamation. It alleged that the university had violated Title IX of the Education Amendments of 1972 (which requires that women have equal access to education) by failing to investigate the student's complaint adequately and by failing to protect her from retaliation, including from McGinn on his blog before his resignation came into effect. McGinn's lawyer, Andrew Berman, said that McGinn denied the claim. The lawsuit was settled in October 2016. All parties are prohibited from disclosing the terms of the settlement.

The incident triggered a debate about the extent to which sexism remains prevalent in academia, particularly in academic philosophy, and the effect on students and teachers of harassment and harassment-related complaints. 

In 2014, McGinn was offered a visiting professorship in the philosophy department at East Carolina University but the offer was later rescinded by university administrators. McGinn blamed the sexual-harassment allegations for East Carolina's decision.

Writing

Philosophy of mind
McGinn has written extensively on philosophical logic, metaphysics, and the philosophy of language but is best known for his work in the philosophy of mind. He is known in particular for the development of the idea that human minds are incapable of solving the problem of consciousness, a position known as new mysterianism. In addition to his academic publications on consciousness –  including The Character of Mind (1982), The Problem of Consciousness (1991) and Consciousness and Its Objects (2004) – he has written a popular introduction, The Mysterious Flame: Conscious Minds in a Material World (1999).

Owen Flanagan introduced the term "new mysterians" in 1991 (named after Question Mark & the Mysterians, a 1960s band) to describe McGinn's position and that of Thomas Nagel, first described in Nagel's "What Is It Like to Be a Bat?" (1974). McGinn introduced his position in "Can We Solve the Mind-Body Problem?" (Mind, 1989), and in The Problem of Consciousness (1991), arguing that the human mind is incapable of comprehending itself entirely. Mark Rowlands writes that the 1989 article was largely responsible for reviving the debate about phenomenal consciousness, or the nature of experience. McGinn argued in the paper for the idea of cognitive closure:

A type of mind M is cognitively closed with respect to a property P (or theory T), if and only if the concept-forming procedures at M's disposal cannot extend to a grasp of P (or an understanding of T). Conceiving minds come in different kinds, equipped with varying powers and limitations, biases and blindspots, so that properties (or theories) may be accessible to some minds but not to others. What is closed to the mind of a rat may be open to the mind of a monkey, and what is open to us may be closed to the monkey. ... But such closure does not reflect adversely on the reality of the properties that lie outside the representational capacities in question; a property is no less real for not being reachable from a certain kind of perceiving and conceiving mind.

Although human beings might grasp the concept of consciousness, McGinn argues that we cannot understand its causal basis: neither direct examination of consciousness nor of the brain can identify the properties that cause or provide the mechanism for consciousness, or how "technicolour phenomenology [can] arise from soggy grey matter." Thus, his answer to the hard problem of consciousness is that the answer is inaccessible to us.

New, or epistemological, mysterianism is contrasted with the old, or ontological, form, namely that consciousness is inherently mysterious or supernatural. The new mysterians are not Cartesian dualists. The argument holds that human minds cannot understand consciousness, not that there is anything supernatural about it. The mind-body problem is simply "the perimeter of our conceptual anatomy making itself felt." McGinn describes this as existential naturalism.

Animal rights
McGinn is a supporter of animal rights, calling our treatment of non-humans "deeply and systematically immoral." His position is that we make the mistake of seeing the non-human only in relation to the human, because of "species solipsism": the farmer sees animals as food, the pet owner as companions for humans, the activist as victims of humans, the evolutionary biologist as "gene survival machines." But "their esse is not human percipi" – "The rhino looks at us with the same skewed solipsism we bring to him," McGinn writes, "and surely we do not want to be as limited in our outlook as he is." He argues that "we need to improve our manners" toward animals by recognizing that they have their own lives, and that those lives ought to be respected.

Novels and articles
Outside his work in philosophy, McGinn has regularly contributed reviews and short stories to the London Review of Books and The New York Review of Books, and has written occasionally for Nature, The New York Times, The Guardian, The Wall Street Journal, The Times and The Times Literary Supplement. He has also written two novels, The Space Trap (1992) and Bad Patches (2012).

Radio and television
In 1984, McGinn discussed John Searle's Reith lectures on BBC Radio Three with Searle, Richard Gregory and Colin Blakemore. The following year, he and Sir Andrew Huxley debated animal rights with Bernard Williams as the moderator. He was interviewed for Jonathan Miller's documentary mini-series, Atheism: A Rough History of Disbelief (2003), later broadcast as The Atheism Tapes (2004). He has also appeared in eleven episodes of Closer to Truth hosted by Robert Lawrence Kuhn, discussing consciousness, personal identity, free will, and materialism.

See also
 List of animal rights advocates

Works
Books

Selected articles

References

Further reading
External links

Official website
Colin McGinn, London Review of Books.
Colin McGinn, The New York Review of Books.
Colin McGinn, The New York Times.
"Portraits: Colin McGinn" (interview), Bill Moyers on Faith & Reason, PBS, 30 June 2006.
Levine, David. "Colin McGinn" (sketch), The New York Review of Books, 7 April 2005.

Books, articles
Blakeslee, Sandra. "The Conscious Mind Is Still Baffling to Experts of All Stripes", The New York Times, 16 April 1996.
Fearn, Nicholas. "Proudly Ignorant", New Statesman, 9 June 2003 (review of McGinn's The Making of a Philosopher).
Horgan, John. The Undiscovered Mind: How the Human Brain Defies Replication, Medication, and Explanation, Free Press, 1999 ("Mysterianism lite", Nature, editorial, 3(199), 2000).
Kriegel, Uriah. "Philosophical Theories of Consciousness: Contemporary Western Perspectives. Mysterianism," in Philip David Zelazo, Morris Moscovitch, Evan Thompson (eds.), The Cambridge Handbook of Consciousness, Cambridge: Cambridge University Press, 2007, pp. 36–41.

1950 births
Living people
20th-century atheists
20th-century British novelists
20th-century British philosophers
20th-century British short story writers
20th-century essayists
21st-century atheists
21st-century British novelists
21st-century British philosophers
21st-century British short story writers
21st-century essayists
Academics of University College London
Alumni of the University of Manchester
Analytic philosophers
Animal rights scholars
British atheism activists
Atheist philosophers
British ethicists
British expatriate academics in the United States
British logicians
British male essayists
British male novelists
British male short story writers
British social commentators
British consciousness researchers and theorists
Epistemologists
Film theorists
Mass media theorists
Metaphilosophers
Metaphysicians
Ontologists
People associated with the Oxford Group (animal rights)
People from West Hartlepool
Philosophers of culture
Philosophers of education
Philosophers of language
Philosophers of literature
Philosophers of logic
Philosophers of mind
Philosophers of science
Philosophers of social science
Philosophy academics
Social philosophers
University of Miami faculty
Writers about religion and science